Solveig Ternström (born 17 July 1937 in Stockholm) is a Swedish actress and former Centre Party politician. She was a member of the Riksdag between 2006 and 2010. She is very negative to nuclear power and left the centre party in July 2010 because she was disappointed to them regarding their updated politics about nuclear power.

Selected filmography
 Rider in Blue (1959)
 The Shot (1969)
 Paradise Place (1977)
 Morsarvet (1993)
 The Viking Sisters (2022)

References

External links
Solveig Ternström at the Riksdag website

Members of the Riksdag from the Centre Party (Sweden)
Living people
1937 births
Women members of the Riksdag
Swedish actresses
Actresses from Stockholm
Litteris et Artibus recipients